Aaron Harper may refer to:

Aaron Harper (basketball) (born 1981), player for Sagesse Beirut
Aaron Harper (politician) (born 1967), Australian politician
Aaron Shawn Harper, American football player
Arran Harper, a character in The Enemy